William McDaniel (1801 – December 14, 1866) was an American banker who served briefly as a U.S. Representative from Missouri from 1846 to 1847. He was an early pioneer in the city of Vacaville, California.

Life

Missouri
Born in Grayson County, Kentucky, McDaniel moved to Missouri in the late 1820s. He served as member of the State senate in 1838 and 1840. He served in the Missouri Volunteers during the Seminole War. McDaniel was elected president of the bank in Palmyra, Missouri, on December 9, 1840. McDaniel was elected as a Democrat to the Twenty-ninth Congress to fill the vacancy caused by the resignation of Sterling Price and served from December 7, 1846, to March 4, 1847. He was operating an agency for the location of land claims at Palmyra on June 10, 1847.

California
He moved to Solano County, California, and laid out the town of Vacaville. A written agreement was signed on December 13, 1851 forming a township for Vacaville, nine square miles of land were deeded to William McDaniel for three thousand dollars, and the original city plans were laid out from that. In the agreement, McDaniel's would name the new town after the Mexican land grant owner, Juan Manuel Cabeza Vaca.

He moved to Humboldt County, California, and established the land office at Humboldt Point in 1858.

Idaho
He moved to the Idaho Territory in 1863 where he practiced law and was associated with the land office. He died in Lewiston, Idaho on December 14, 1866.

References

1801 births
1866 deaths
Date of birth missing
Democratic Party Missouri state senators
People from Grayson County, Kentucky
American people of the Seminole Wars
American bankers
American city founders
Democratic Party members of the United States House of Representatives from Missouri
People from Vacaville, California
People from Humboldt County, California
19th-century American politicians
19th-century American businesspeople